In German humour, a Manta joke is a joke cycle about the Mantafahrer ("Manta driver"), the male owner of an Opel Manta, who is an aggressive driver, dull, lower class, macho, and infatuated with both his car and his blonde hairdresser girlfriend.

Jokes poke fun at a stereotype of the working class owner of a second-tier muscle car, typified by the Manta. Mantas were targeted at buyers who yearned for a sports car but could not afford a status car such as a BMW or Mercedes. Proud Manta owners often decorated them with chrome, G-T stripes, racing tyres, or high beams to mimic the exclusiveness of race cars.

Example jokes are:
What was left after a fatal Manta accident? - A gold chain and a hairdresser in mourning.
What is the shortest Manta joke ever? - Ein Manta steht vor der Uni (A Manta parked in front of a university).
What does a Manta driver say after crashing into a tree? – Komisch--hab doch gehupt! ("That's strange -- I honked!")

The popularity of such jokes spawned two successful films -  and Manta, Manta, the latter starring Til Schweiger as the Mantafahrer.

See also
Russian jokes: New Russians
Boy racer
Hoon
Mondeo man
Rice burner
White van man

References

German humour
Joke cycles